"Newton's apple" may refer to:

 Isaac Newton's apple analogy of gravitation
 Newton's Apple, the 1983–1998 educational television program
 Flower of Kent, reputed to be the apple cultivar that inspired Isaac Newton's apple analogy of gravitation
 Apple of Universal Gravity, a 2019 compilation album by Japanese musician Ringo Sheena, which has the Japanese title Newton no Ringo, or "Newton's Apple"